Buellia saxorum is a species of crustose lichen belonging to the family Physciaceae. It is found in Europe.

See also
List of Buellia species

References

saxorum
Lichen species
Lichens described in 1852
Lichens of Europe
Taxa named by Abramo Bartolommeo Massalongo